This is a list of schools in Blackburn with Darwen in the English county of Lancashire.

State-funded schools

Primary schools

Ashleigh Primary School, Darwen
Audley Infant School, Blackburn
Audley Junior School, Blackburn
Avondale Primary School, Darwen
Blackburn St Thomas' CE Primary School, Blackburn
Blackburn the Redeemer CE Primary, Blackburn
Brookhouse Primary School, Blackburn
Cedars Primary School, Blackburn
Daisyfield Primary School, Blackburn
Darwen St Barnabas CE Primary Academy, Darwen
Darwen St James CE Primary Academy, Darwen
Darwen St Peter's CE Primary School, Darwen
Feniscowles Primary School, Feniscowles
Griffin Park Primary School, Blackburn
Hoddlesden St Paul's CE Primary School, Hoddlesden
Holy Souls RC Primary School, Blackburn
Holy Trinity CE School, Darwen
Intack Primary School, Blackburn
Lammack Primary School, Blackburn
Livesey St Francis' CE Primary School, Blackburn
Longshaw Community Junior School, Blackburn
Longshaw Infant School, Blackburn
Lower Darwen Primary School, Lower Darwen
Meadowhead Infant School, Blackburn
Meadowhead Junior School, Blackburn
The Olive School, Blackburn
Our Lady of Perpetual Succour RC Primary School, Blackburn
Queen Elizabeth's Grammar School, Blackburn
Roe Lee Park Primary School, Blackburn
Sacred Heart RC Primary School, Blackburn
St Aidan's CE Primary School, Blackburn
St Alban's RC Primary School, Blackburn
St Anne's RC Primary School, Blackburn
St Antony's RC Primary School, Blackburn
St Barnabas and St Paul's CE Primary School, Blackburn
St Cuthbert's CE Primary School, Blackburn
St Edward's RC Primary School, Darwen
St Gabriel's CE Primary School, Blackburn
St James' CE Primary School, Blackburn
St James' CE Primary School, Lower Darwen
St Joseph's RC Primary School, Darwen
St Luke and St Philips CE Primary School, Blackburn
St Mary's and St Joseph's RC Primary School, Blackburn
St Matthew's CE Primary School, Blackburn
St Michael with St John CE Primary School, Blackburn
St Paul's RC Primary School, Feniscowles
St Peter's RC Primary School, Blackburn
St Silas' CE Primary School, Blackburn
St Stephen's CE Primary School, Blackburn
St Stephen's Tockholes CE Primary School, Tockholes
Shadsworth Infant School, Blackburn
Shadsworth Junior School, Blackburn
Sudell Primary School, Darwen
Turton and Edgworth CE Primary School, Edgworth
Turton Belmont Community Primary School, Belmont
Wensley Fold CE Primary Academy, Blackburn

Secondary schools

Blackburn Central High School, Blackburn
Darwen Aldridge Community Academy, Darwen
Darwen Aldridge Enterprise Studio, Darwen
Darwen Vale High School, Darwen
Our Lady and St John Catholic College, Blackburn
Pleckgate High School, Blackburn
Queen Elizabeth's Grammar School, Blackburn
St Bede's RC High School, Blackburn
St Wilfrid's Church of England Academy, Blackburn
Tauheedul Islam Boys' High School, Blackburn
Tauheedul Islam Girls' High School, Blackburn
Witton Park Academy, Blackburn

Special and alternative schools
Crosshill Special School, Darwen
Eden School, Blackburn
The Heights Free School, Blackburn
Newfield School, Blackburn
St Thomas's Centre, Blackburn

Further education
Blackburn College, Blackburn
St Mary's Sixth Form College, Blackburn

Independent schools

Primary and preparatory schools
Dar Ul Madinah, Blackburn
Rawdhatul Uloom Islamic Primary School, Blackburn

Senior and all-through schools
Al Islah Girls' High School, Blackburn
Islamiyah School, Blackburn
Jamiatul Ilm Wal Huda, Blackburn
Markazul Uloom, Blackburn
Noorul Uloom, Blackburn
Rawdhatul Ilm Wal Huda, Blackburn
Westholme School, Blackburn

Special and alternative schools
Aurora Woodlands School, Darwen
Lower Pastures, Hoddlesden

Blackburn with Darwen
Schools In Blackburn With Darwen
Schools in Blackburn with Darwen